After gaining recognition by the International Olympic Committee in December 2014, Kosovo has participated at the European Youth Olympic Festival since the 2015 Summer edition and the 2017 Winter edition.

Medal tables

Medals by Summer Youth Olympic Festival

Medals by Winter Youth Olympic Festival

Medals by sport

List of medalists

See also
Kosovo at the Youth Olympics
Kosovo at the Olympics

References

External links
Olympic Committee of Kosovo

Youth sport in Kosovo
Nations at the European Youth Olympic Festival
Kosovo at multi-sport events